The Royal Ministry of Education and Research (short name Kunnskapsdepartementet) is a Norwegian government ministry responsible for education, research, kindergartens and integration. The ministry was established in 1814 as the Royal Ministry of Church and Education Affairs.

The current Minister of Education is Tonje Brenna of the Labour Party and the current Minister of Research and Higher Education is Ola Borten Moe of the Centre Party. The department reports to the legislature (Stortinget).

History

The ministry was established in 1814, following the dissolution of Denmark–Norway, in which the joint central government administration of the two formally separate but closely integrated kingdoms, had been based in Copenhagen. Originally named the Ministry of Church and Education Affairs, the ministry was the first of six government ministries established in 1814, and was also known as the First Ministry. The other ministries were the Ministry of Justice, the Ministry of Police, the Ministry of the Interior, the Ministry of Finance and the Ministry of War.

Norway was in a union with Sweden with a common foreign and defense policy until 1905, however church and educational policy was entirely the domain of each respective national government.

The ministry was previously responsible for church affairs, but this function was transferred to the Ministry of Culture in 2002. Kindergartens were transferred to the ministry in 2006.

Organisation

Departments
The Ministry of Education and Research consists of seven departments:
 Department of Integration
 Department of Schools and Kindergartens
 Department of Education, Training and Skills Policy
 Department of Administration and Strategic Priorities
 Department of Legal Affairs
 Department of Governance of Higher Education and Research Institutions
 Department of Higher Education, Research and International Affairs

Subsidiaries

Subordinate agencies 
The following government agencies are subordinate to the ministry:
Norwegian Agency for Quality Assurance in Education, or Nasjonalt organ for kvalitet i utdanningen (Official site) conducts quality assurance of higher education institutions and tertiary vocational training, as well as recognition of degrees from foreign countries.
 Norwegian Agency for International Cooperation and Quality Enhancement in Higher Education, or Direktorat for internasjonalisering og kvalitetsutvikling i høyere utdanning (Official site) Promotes international cooperation in higher education and research.
 Norwegian State Educational Loan Fund, or Statens lånekasse for utdanning (Official site) Awards loans and grants to students.
Norwegian Universities and Colleges Admission Service, or Samordna opptak (Official site) Coordinates admission to most undergraduate courses at state universities and colleges.
 Skills Norway, or Kompetanse Norge (Official site) works in areas such as adult education in basic skills, Norwegian language and socio-cultural orientation, vocational training, career advice and matching skills with the needs of the labour market.
 Unit - the Directorate for ICT and Joint Services in Higher Education and Research (Official site) provides governance of and access to shared information and communications technology (ICT) services.
 Research Council of Norway, or Norges forskningsråd (Official site) is responsible for research funding and research policy.
 The Norwegian National Research Ethics Committees, or De nasjonale forskningsetiske komiteene (Official site) are professionally independent agencies for questions regarding research ethics, and for investigating misconduct in all fields of study. 
 Norwegian Directorate for Education and Training, or Utdanningsdirektoratetet (Official site) Responsible for the development of primary and secondary education. Approves the primary and secondary school curriculum.
 Statped (Official site) is a national service for special needs education for county municipalities and municipalities.
 National Parents' Committee for Kindergartens, or Foreldreutvalget for barnehager (FUB) (Official site) ensures that the voices of parents are heard in debates on kindergarten policy, and it also acts as the Ministry of Education and Research's advisory and consultative body representing parents interests.
 National Parents’ Committee for Primary and Secondary Education, or Foreldreutvalget for grunnskolen (FUG) (Official site)  ensures that the voices of parents are heard in debates on education policy, and it also acts as the Ministry of Education and Research’s advisory and consultative body representing parents’ interests.
 Directorate of Integration and Diversity, or Integrerings- og mangfoldsdirektoratet (Official site) is responsible for implementing public policy concerning integration.
 22 July Information Center, or 22. juli-senteret (Official site) is an information center dedicated to the 22 July 2011 terrorist attacks in Norway, in Oslo and at Utøya.
Norwegian Institute of International Affairs, or Norsk utenrikspolitisk institutt (Official site) Foreign policy research.
 VEA – State School for Gardeners and Florists, or Norges grønne fagskole - Vea (Official site) Educates gardeners and flower decorators at secondary school level.

Universities
Nord University, or Nord universitet (Official site)
Norwegian University of Life Sciences, or Norges miljø- og biovitenskapelige universitet (Official site)
Norwegian University of Science and Technology, or Norges teknisk-naturvitenskapelige universitet (Official site)
University of Bergen, or Universitetet i Bergen (Official site)
University of Oslo, or Universitetet i Oslo (Official site)
University of Stavanger, or Universitetet i Stavanger (Official site)
University of Tromsø, or Universitetet i Tromsø (Official site)
University of Agder, or Universitetet i Agder (Official site)
 Oslo Metropolitan University, or Oslomet – storbyuniversitet (Official site)
 University of South-east Norway, or Universitetet i Sørøst-Norge (Official site)

Specialised University Colleges
Oslo School of Architecture and Design, or Arkitektur- og designhøgskolen i Oslo (Official site)
Norwegian School of Economics and Business Administration, or Norges handelshøgskole (Official site)
Norwegian School of Sport Sciences, or Norges idrettshøgskole (Official site)
Norwegian Academy of Music, or Norges musikkhøgskole (Official site)
Norwegian School of Veterinary Science, or Norges veterinærhøgskole (Official site)
 Oslo National Academy of the Arts, or Kunsthøgskolen i Oslo (Official site)
 MF Norwegian School of Theology, Religion and Society, or Det teologiske menighets fakultet (Official site)
 BI Norwegian Business School, or Handelshøyskolen BI (Official site)
 Molde University College, or Høgskolen i Molde - Vitenskapelig høgskole i logistikk (Official site)

University Colleges
 Inland Norway University of Applied Sciences, or Høgskolen i Innlandet (Official site)
Sámi University College, or Samisk høgskole  (Official site)
Volda University College, or Høgskolen i Volda (Official site)
Western Norway University of Applied Sciences, or Høgskolen på Vestlandet (Official site)
Østfold University College, or Høgskolen i Østfold (Official site)

Limited companies
 Norwegian Centre for Research Data, or Norsk senter for forskningsdata (Official site) Information and data services for higher education and research.
 University Centre in Svalbard, or Universitetssenteret på Svalbard (Official site) conducts research and some university-level educational offerings in Arctic studies.
 Uninett (Official site) Operates the national education and research internet communication network and the norid domain register.
Simula Research Laboratory (Official site) conducts research in the fields of networks and distributed systems, scientific computing, and software engineering.

Ministers of Education
Key

Ministers for the 1st Ministry (1814–1819)

Ministers of Education and Church Affairs (1819–1884)

Ministers of Education and Church Affairs (1884–1945)

Ministers of Education and Church Affairs (1945–1990)

Ministers of Education and Research (1990–present)

Minister of Higher Education
The Minister of Higher Education is responsible for policies regarding higher education. The post was originally established in 2007, before its responsibilities were transferred to the Ministry of Culture. The post was re-established when the Liberal Party joined the Solberg Cabinet in 2018.

Key

Ministers

References

External links
 

Education and Research
Education in Norway
Norway
Norway
Ministries established in 1814
1814 establishments in Norway
Research ministries